Streams is a live album by American jazz saxophonist Sam Rivers featuring performances recorded at the Montreux Jazz Festival in 1973 for the Impulse! label.

Reception
The Allmusic review by Steve Huey awarded the album 5 stars stating "The music is pure stream-of-consciousness -- no discernible pre-set themes, just free-flowing ideas and interaction among the musicians... It's a shame there aren't more documents of this phase in Rivers' career, though that could be said of pretty much all of his phases. If it's Rivers the free improviser you're looking for, Streams is a tour de force and one of the highlights of his extremely distinguished career".

Track listing
All compositions by Sam Rivers
 Spoken Introduction - 1:18
 "Tenor Saxophone Section/Beginning of Flute Section" - 23:12
 "Conclusion of Flute Section/Piano Section/Soprano Saxophone Section" -25:14
Recorded at the 1973 Montreux Jazz Festival held in Montreux, Switzerland on July 6, 1973

Personnel
Sam Rivers - soprano saxophone, tenor saxophone, flute, piano
Cecil McBee - bass
Norman Connors - drums, gongs

References

Impulse! Records live albums
Sam Rivers (jazz musician) albums
1973 live albums